Noisseville is a commune in the Moselle department in Grand Est in north-eastern France.

History
In the 12th century, the commune was known by its name as "Noacivilla". At the same period the Romanesque style church of Saint-Etienne Parish was also built. The parish was under by the Bishopric of Metz until it was passed to the Roman Catholic Diocese of Metz in the 17th century. The area was known for its actual battle of Metz in the series of Franco-Prussian War between the French and Prussian forces in 1870 when the French forces retreated to this area for shelter.

The place is also known for its French memorial against German invasion between 1871 and 1918. And it is also the place of a war memorial for the German troops who died from the battle of Metz in 1870 by a representation of a sleeping lion.

See also
 Communes of the Moselle department

References

External links
 

Communes of Moselle (department)